L’Homme idéal is a 1997 French film directed by Xavier Gélin.

Synopsis 
Marie, incapable of choosing between three marriage proposals, decides to give up. Circumstances mean that the three men meet. Far from being hostile, Stéphane, Fabrice and Paul console each other....

Cast 
 Pascal Légitimus as Stéphane
 Christophe Malavoy as Fabrice
 Daniel Russo as Paul
 Amélie Pick as Marie
 Zabou Breitman as Madeleine
 Fanny Cottençon as Claire
 Mylène Demongeot as Guillemette
 Christine Boisson as Nicole
 K-mel as Grégoire
 Marie Fugain as Sabine
 François Berléand as The Balto's man
 Rita Lafontaine as Lucie's mother

References

External links 
 

1997 films
1997 comedy films
French comedy films
1990s French-language films
1990s French films